Jurema may refer to:
 Jurema, Pernambuco, a municipality in the state of Pernambuco in Brazil
 Jurema, Piauí, a municipality in the state of Piauí in the Northeast region of Brazil
 Jurema River, a river in Ceará, Brazil
 Mimosa tenuiflora, a perennial tree or shrub native to the northeastern region of Brazil